Yüksekören (literally "high ruins" in Turkish) may refer to the following places in Turkey:

 Yüksekören, Aladağ, a village in the district of Aladağ, Adana Province
 Yüksekören, Kozan, a village in the district of Kozan, Adana Province